The South African Hang Gliding and Paragliding Association (SAHPA) is a membership-based organisation which represents the interests of pilots partaking in Paragliding, Hang-Gliding and related air-sports:

 paragliders (PG)
 hang gliders (HG)
 powered paragliders (PPG)
 powered hang gliders (PHG)
 para-trikes

All pilots that part take in these sports must be licensed by the South African Civil Aviation Authority (SACAA), as required by the Civil Aviation Act.

Scope 
SAHPA focuses on the following sports:

 paragliding
 hang gliding
 powered paragliding
 powered hang gliding
 and para-trikes.

Mandate 
SAHPA has been mandated by the South African Civil Aviation Authority (see “South African Civil Aviation Regulations, 2011, as amended, Regulation 149.01.1) to:

 To oversee and develop the safe operation of its members and continuously evaluate compliance with the condition of its approved MOP, the SACAR and standards as determined by RAASA
 To advise CAASA on regulatory amendments applicable to its operation
 To notify CAASA of any-non-compliance by its members of its MOP
 Approval subject to regular review and audits as required by CAASA from time to time”

All pilots that take part in these sports in South Africa must do so with a valid pilot licence. Foreign pilots may obtain a Foreign Pilot Permit from SAHPA by providing their IPPI Card for validation.

Site Guide 
The SAHPA Site Guide is an ongoing project supported by volunteers who contribute their insight and experience. It is based on, and includes original content from Greg Hamerton’s Fresh Air Site Guide (5th edition, 2006).

See also
 Sport in South Africa

References

External links
Official Website
SAHPA Site Guide
South African Civil Aviation Authority
Paragliders & Hangglider Pilots Worldwide

Hang Gliding and Paragliding
Paragliding